Then 1934 Open Championship featured the defending open champion and amateur champion F. D. Amr Bey of Egypt being challenged by Don Butcher the professional champion. The first leg was held at Butcher's Conservative Club on 12 November, but it was Bey once again who prevailed winning three games to one. The second leg took place on 19 November at the Bath Club, Bey at his home club was given his sternest test yet finally winning three games to two.

Results

First Leg

Second Leg

References

Men's British Open Squash Championships
Men's British Open Squash Championship
Men's British Open Squash Championship
Men's British Open Squash Championship
Men's British Open Squash Championship
Squash competitions in London